USS Decker (DE-47) was an Evarts class destroyer escort constructed for the United States Navy during World War II. She was sent off into dangerous North Atlantic Ocean waters to protect convoys and other ships from German submarines and fighter aircraft. She performed escort and antisubmarine operations in battle areas before sailing home victorious at the end of the conflict.

Originally intended for transfer to Great Britain as BDE-47, Decker was launched on 24 July 1942 by the Philadelphia Navy Yard; retained for use in the USN; redesignated Decker (DE-47) on 4 March 1943; and commissioned on 3 May 1943.

Namesake
Ernest Elden Decker was born on 15 September 1913 in Portland, Maine He enlisted in the United States Naval Reserve on 14 September 1940. Lieutenant (junior grade) Decker was killed in action in the Solomon Islands on 5 September 1942 when his ship  was sunk in an engagement with Imperial Japanese Navy ships.

Service history

World War II
After escorting two oilers from Newport, Rhode Island to Galveston, Texas from 9–24 July 1943, Decker reported at Norfolk, Virginia on 20 August for convoy duty. From 26 August 1943 – 26 April 1945, she gave vital support to operations in North Africa, Italy, and Southern France by guarding the passage of nine supply convoys to Casablanca, French Morocco; Bizerte, Tunisia; Palermo, Sicily; and Oran, Algeria. On 11 May 1944, at sea as part of the screen of UGS-40 bound for Tunisia, she aided in repelling a heavy torpedo attack by enemy planes.

After overhaul at Charleston, South Carolina, Decker operated in the Florida Keys as a training vessel until the end of the war.

Decker received one battle star for World War II service.

Post-War
On 28 August 1945, she was leased to the Republic of China. Decker was returned from Lend-Lease and transferred permanently to China on 7 February 1948 and renamed ROCS Tai Ping (F-22). ROCS Tai-ping was one of the four warships sent by the Republic of China Navy on 6 November 1946 to claim islands within the South China Sea region. On 12 December 1946 Tai Ping arrived at Itu Aba island, becoming the first Chinese government ship ever to visit the Spratly Islands. (An American force had landed on Itu Aba in November 1945 and discovered that the wartime Japanese garrison had departed. A French warship, the FR Chevreuil had landed a team on Itu Aba in October 1946, two months before the Tai-ping arrived.) The Chinese government gave Itu Aba the Chinese name of Taiping Island in honour of the ship.

On 13 February 1951, She joined the blockade fleet under the direct order of ROC President Chiang Kai-shek to capture and confiscate the Norwegian civilian freighter Hoi Houw at  within the Japanese territory of Yaeyama Islands. On 14 November 1954, four Communist Chinese motor torpedo boats sank Tai Ping north of the Tachen Islands. All but 28 of the 200 officers and crew were reported rescued by ships and seaplanes.

Awards

References

1942 ships
Evarts-class destroyer escorts
Evarts-class destroyer escorts of the Republic of China Navy
Ships built in Philadelphia
Shipwrecks in the East China Sea
Shipwrecks of China
Training ships of the United States Navy
World War II frigates and destroyer escorts of the United States
Maritime incidents in 1954